We Weren't Crazy is the second studio album by American country music artist Josh Gracin. Originally titled All About Y'all, the album was slated for release in mid-2006 after the release of its debut single "Favorite State of Mind". However the album release was delayed when the debut single failed to perform strongly on radio. A second single, "I Keep Coming Back", was issued in early 2007, and the album's name was changed to I Keep Coming Back. This single similarly failed to perform well. The album was finally issued on April 1, 2008 as a limited release, following the release of its title track which was a top 10 hit.

Overall, the album's five singles have all charted in the Top 40 on the Hot Country Songs charts, including the number ten title track. Next came "Unbelievable (Ann Marie)" (a song that Josh Gracin wrote about his then-wife Ann Marie), which peaked at number 36, his least successful single to date, and "Telluride", which was previously recorded by Tim McGraw on his 2001 album Set This Circus Down, which peaked at number 34. "I Don't Want to Live" was recorded as "I Don't Wanna Live" by Chris Cagle on his 2008 album My Life's Been a Country Song. The album debuted at number four on the Billboard Top Country Albums chart.

Sales of We Weren't Crazy failed to meet those of Gracin's debut, with 18,000 units sold on its first week. He parted company with Lyric Street in April 2009 after the poor chart performance of "Telluride".

Critical reception

AllMusic editor Thom Jurek called the album's content "formulaic contemporary country", but gave praise to tracks like the title track and "Telluride" as highlights and Gracin's vocal delivery for carrying the material effortlessly, concluding that "if anyone has a chance of making lightning strike twice it's him." The 9513's Jim Malec also gave praise to Gracin's performance on tracks that were "considerably substantive and surprisingly emotionally complex" on "a near flawless set of contemporary country material," but felt that it relied too heavily on tempo and lacked songs that contained emotional depth and intimacy for the listeners, concluding that "it is a solid effort that would greatly benefit from one or two standout ballads, and which, despite its many strengths, ultimately falls short of artistically exceptional." Ken Tucker of Billboard called it a "solid follow-up" based on the title track, "Favorite State of Mind", "Livin' It Up" and "Unbelievable (Ann Marie)". Rick Bell of Country Standard Time was critical of the album's production being "cluttered and uneven" throughout the track listing but called it "a safe, pleasant follow-up."

Track listing

Chart performance

Album

Singles

Personnel
Adapted from the We Weren't Crazy liner notes.

Vocals

Josh Gracin – lead vocals 
Russell Terrell – background vocals 
Brett James – background vocals 

Perry Coleman – background vocals 
Tom Bukovac – background vocals 
Jerry McPherson – background vocals 

Instrumentation

Larry Beaird – acoustic guitar 
Bryan Sutton – acoustic guitar 
Ilya Toshinsky – acoustic guitar 
Kelly Back – electric guitar 
Tom Bukovac – electric guitar 
J. T. Corenflos – electric guitar 
Troy Lancaster – electric guitar 
Mike Brignardello – bass guitar 
Glenn Worf – bass guitar 
Jimmie Lee Sloas – bass guitar 
Dan Dugmore – steel guitar 
Paul Franklin – steel guitar 

Russ Pahl – steel guitar 
Rob Hajacos – fiddle 
Steve Nathan – Hammond B-3 , piano 
Jonathan Yudkin – banjo , fiddle , mandolin 
Michael Rojas – keyboards , organ, piano 
Matt Rollings – keyboards 
Tim Akers – keyboards 
Larry Harden – drums 
Chris McHugh – drums 
Brian Pruitt – drums 
Lonnie Wilson – drums 
Jim Hoke – harmonica 

Technical

Marty Williams – mixing 
Luke Wooten – associate producer, mixing 
Bart Morris – assistant engineer, additional recording, digital editing 
Kyle Manner – assistant engineer 

Leslie Richter – assistant engineer 
Mike "Frog" Griffith – production coordination 
Donna Winklmann – production coordination 
Leon Zervos – mastering 

Imagery
Sherri Halford, Ashley Heron, Glenn Sweitzer – art direction
Glenn Sweitzer/Fresh Design – package design
Margaret Malandrucculo – photography
Melody Malloy – wardrobe
Crystal Tesinksy – grooming

References

2008 albums
Josh Gracin albums
Lyric Street Records albums
Albums produced by Brett James